Oberea birmanica is a species of flat-faced longhorn beetle in the tribe Saperdini in the genus Oberea, discovered by Gahan in 1895.

References

B
Beetles described in 1895